Man with a Mission, stylized as MAN WITH A MISSION or sometimes as MWAM, is a Japanese rock band which was formed in Shibuya, Tokyo, Japan, in 2010. The band currently consists of five band members, with stage names of Tokyo Tanaka (vocals, leader), Jean-Ken Johnny (guitar, vocals, rap), Kamikaze Boy (bass guitar, backing vocals), DJ Santa Monica (DJ, sampling) and Spear Rib (drums). Their distinguishing feature is that all of the members wear differently designed wolf masks during both their concerts and their music videos. Many of their singles have been used as theme songs for a variety of anime, live-action movies, and video games.

Background
Before becoming popular, the band invented a back-story for why they wear wolf masks, which involves them being created as the "Ultimate Life Form" by Jimi Hendrix, who is described by the band as being the doctor of the guitar and master wolf biologist. They were then frozen in Antarctica for years. While they were frozen, they had been listening to all kinds of music from all around the world, before later escaping and emerging onto the Japanese music scene.

History

Beginnings and first album
The earliest debut of the band was in a number of live gigs at venues in the Shibuya area. The band organized an American tour in late 2010, which was called their "Whisky a Go Go" tour and involved multiple gigs at night clubs in Los Angeles. The tour itself ended in November 2010. The end of their tour coincided with the release of their first mini album, Welcome to the New World, in November as well, which went on to sell out in a number of stores across Japan. The mini album also spent six weeks on the Oricon Top 100 for number of sales.  On April 29, 2011, they released a new single titled "Never Fxxkin' Mind the Rules". After the single release, the band started another music tour on March 7, 2011, called "Man with a Mission Japan Marking Tour 2011", which included 13 different performances across Japan. Their first full debut album, Man with a Mission, released on June 8, 2011. Soon after the release of their album, they performed at Summer Sonic 2011 in mid-August, and also a number of other festivals, such as Countdown Japan 11/12. Labeled by Eggman Magazine as the "Most Promising Newcomer", tickets to their show at the concert festival sold out within ten minutes. During the stream of concerts, their songs were also run on 27 of the major FM and AM radio broadcasting stations nationwide across Japan. On October 5, 2011, the band released an EP titled Trick or Treat, which included a number of original songs and also cover songs, such as "Smells Like Teen Spirit" by Nirvana. The members of Man with a Mission were also featured in a poster campaign by Tower Records titled "No Music, No Life?", which began on September 13, 2011.

Mash Up the World

On May 27, 2012, MWAM held a show tour at Shibuya-AX with an attendance of 1,800 fans. It was an early performance for the band's Don't Feel The Distance tour set in November, which was meant to highlight one of the singles, "Distance", from their upcoming album. The single's earlier release on April 4 to the Oricon rankings saw it rise to #6 in the sales chart.  The expected stops on the tour included Zepp Nagoya, Zepp Namba, and Zepp Tokyo. Pre-order tickets for all venues of the tour were sold out "instantly" across Japan. The band's second full album, Mash Up The World, was released on July 18, 2012. The band uploaded the music video for one of the album's singles, "From Youth To Death", onto YouTube on June 21, 2012. The official app for the album also included snippets of the single, along with two other original songs, "Mash UP The DJ!" and "Neutral Corner". "Distance"'s April release also saw it being chosen as the opening theme music for TV Asahi's Music Ru TV channel for the month. The band was also invited as guests to Japan Expo 2012, playing as the rock showcase on July 5, 2012.

Tales of Purefly
Their next single, "Emotions", which was used as a theme for the live action movie adaptation of the Hentai Kamen manga, was released on February 20, 2013. The follow-up single "Database" was used as the opening theme for the anime Log Horizon  Another song from the album, titled "Wake Myself Again", was used as the theme song for the live-action film of the manga Judge. Character models of the MWAM band were added to the Japanese release of the video game Pro Evolution Soccer 2015, along with the Tales of Purefly song "Higher", which was previously used in the Japanese version of World Soccer: Winning Eleven 2014 - Aoki Samurai no Chousen. The song "whatever you had said was everything" was featured in a commercial TV spot for the live action film Crows Explode, which is based on the manga Crows.

The World's On Fire
Man With a Mission performed the theme song for the anime The Seven Deadly Sins, titled "Seven Deadly Sins". The song peaked at #2 on the Billboard Japan Hot 100 and stayed for 9 weeks. Their single titled "Raise Your Flag" was featured as the opening song for the anime Mobile Suit Gundam: Iron-Blooded Orphans. The song also peaked at #2 on the Billboard Japan Hot 100 and stayed for 17 weeks. The fourth studio album titled The World's On Fire was released on February 10, 2016, preceded by the album's third single "Memories". The first song on the album, titled "Survivor", was chosen by Capcom to be the image song for the video game Street Fighter V.

Chasing the Horizon
MWAM released the single "Dead End in Tokyo" on January 25, 2017; co-written, co-composed and co-produced by Patrick Stump of Fall Out Boy, the song was used as the theme song for the movie Shinjuku Swan II.  On June 27 of the same year, the band would release a second single entitled "Dog Days"; the song would be utilized in a TV commercial for Asahi Dry Zero beer in Japan. In 2017 they would also create the song "My Hero" to serve as the opening to the anime Inuyashiki as well as the song "Find You" to be used as the ending to the live action film adaptation of Anonymous Noise.  The band collaborated with their fellow Japanese music group Tokyo Ska Paradise Orchestra in 2018 to create the song "Freak It!", which was released on February 2 and selected as the official song of Japan's Sunwolves Super Rugby team. On April 18, MWAM released the "Take Me Under/Winding Road" single.  The band announced their fifth studio album, Chasing the Horizon, six days later; this album differs from their prior four in that this will be the first MWAM album to get an international release, while the album is set to release in Japan on June 6, it will be available digitally worldwide 2 days later and then an international version of the album will be physically released on August 10, 2018 featuring bonus materials.  The single "Break the Contradictions" off the album was selected as the theme of New Japan Pro-Wrestling's 2018 G1 Climax, the company's premier tournament.

Ten-year anniversary
2020 marked the 10 year anniversary of the band's debut and they set out to do a number of things to celebrate the event.  On February 17 they announced an outdoor festival called THE MISSION to celebrate this milestone; unfortunately due to the COVID-19 pandemic they were forced to cancel the festival.  In addition to this festival, MWAM set out to release a trio of compilation albums; April 1 saw the release of  Man with a "B-Sides & Covers" Mission while the following month saw the release of Man with a "Remix" Mission on May 17 with  Man with a "Best" Mission slated to be released on July 15.  On August 29 the band live streamed a concert from Zepp Tokyo online entitled MAN WITH A “REBOOT & LIVE STREAMING” MISSION, and during this show announced they would be releasing a trilogy of singles in the fall; the first single releases in October with two more to follow in November and December.  On October 29 the band released the first of the singles, "Telescope", as well as broadcasting a live show from KT Zepp Yokohama online entitled MAN WITH A "Telescope" MISSION.  The band released the second of their singles trilogy on November 29 entitled "All You Need" and celebrated the release with another live streamed show from Zepp Nagoya entitled MAN WITH A "All You Need" MISSION. Finally, on December 29 they released the final single, "evergeen", with a live streamed show from Zepp Fukuoka called MAN WITH A "evergreen" MISSION.

A new story begins
In their 2020 end of the year video posted to YouTube, the band announced that on February 9, 2021 a new story will begin.  On January 21, 2021 they announced a new EP entitled One Wish e.p. to be released February 10.  On April 28th, the band released the single "Perfect Clarity".  The band created the theme song for the Japanese release of Godzilla vs Kong entitled "INTO THE DEEP", the single of the song is set to be released on June 9.  The band culminated this by live-streaming the final show from their ONE WISH TOUR from Zepp Sapporo on May 14th, featuring the debut of the "INTO THE DEEP" music video.

Break and Cross the Walls I and II
On October 2, 2021, the band announced they were set to release their sixth studio album Break and Cross the Walls I on November 24 of the same year. On March 14, 2022 the follow-up album Break and Cross the Walls II was announced with a release date of May 25th.  On April 23rd, the band performed a concert as part of the inaugural X Games Chiba event in Chiba, Japan.  On May 8th MAN WITH A MISSION was featured on YouTube's fifth Music Weekend special event, showcasing a variety of recorded live performances by the band.

Band members

Current members
Tokyo Tanaka – vocals, leader (2010–present) 
Jean-Ken Johnny – guitar, vocals, rap (2010–present)
Kamikaze Boy – bass guitar, backing vocals (2010–present) 
DJ Santa Monica – DJ, sampling (2010–present) 
Spear Rib – drums (2010–present)

Support members
E.D. Vedder – guitar (2010–present)

Discography

Studio albums

Compilation albums

Extended plays

Singles
{| class="wikitable plainrowheaders"
|-
! scope="col" rowspan="2"| Title
! scope="col" rowspan="2"| Year
! scope="col" colspan="2"| Peak chart positions
! scope="col" rowspan="2"| Certifications
! scope="col" rowspan="2"| Notes
! scope="col" rowspan="2"| Album
|-
!scope="col" style="width:4em;font-size:90%"| JPNOricon
!scope="col" style="width:4em;font-size:90%"| JPNBillboard
|-
! scope="row"| "Man with a Mission"
|align="center"|2010
|align="center"|—
|align="center"|—
|
|rowspan="2"| 
| 
|-
! scope="row"| "Rain of July"
|align="center" rowspan="2"|2011
|align="center"|—
|align="center"|—
|
|align="center" rowspan="2"|Man with a Mission
|-
! scope="row"| "Never Fxxkin' Mind the Rules"
|align="center"|88
|align="center"|—
|
| 
|-
! scope="row"| "Distance"
|align="center"|2012
|align="center"|6
|align="center"|8
|
| 
|align="center"| Mash Up The World
|-
! scope="row"| "Emotions"
|align="center" rowspan="3"| 2013
|align="center"|3
|align="center"|3
|
| 
|align="center" rowspan="3"| Tales of Purefly
|-
! scope="row"| "Wake Myself Again"
|align="center"|—
|align="center"|25
|
| 
|-
! scope="row"| "Database"
|align="center"|4
|align="center"|2
|
 RIAJ: Gold
| 
|-
! scope="row"| "Seven Deadly Sins"
|align="center" rowspan="3"|2015
|align="center"|2
|align="center"|2
|
 RIAJ: Gold
| 
|align="center" rowspan="4"| The World's On Fire
|-
! scope="row"| "Out of Control"
|align="center"|2
|align="center"|45
|
| {{small|ED theme song for the Japanese release of Mad Max: Fury Road.}}
|-
! scope="row"| "Raise Your Flag"
|align="center"|3
|align="center"|2
|
 RIAJ: Platinum
| 
|-
! scope="row"| "Memories"
|align="center"|2016
|align="center"|17
|align="center"|21
|
| 
|-
! scope="row"| "Dead End in Tokyo"
|align="center" rowspan="3"|2017
|align="center"|5
|align="center"|5
|
| 
| align="center" rowspan="7"| Chasing the Horizon|-
! scope="row"| "Dog Days"
|align="center"|—
|align="center"|57
|
|
|-
! scope="row"| "My Hero / Find You"
|align="center"|2
|align="center"|6
|
| 
|-
! scope="row"| "Freak It!"
| align="center" rowspan="4" |2018
| align="center" |9
| align="center" |24
|
| 
|-
! scope="row"| "Take Me Under / Winding Road"
|align="center"|4
| align="center"|9
| 
| 
|-
! scope="row"| "2045"
| align="center" |—
| align="center" |—
|
| 
|-
! scope="row"| "Hey Now"
| align="center" |—
| align="center" |—
|
|
|-
! scope="row"| "Left Alive"
| align="center" rowspan="3"| 2019
| align="center"| 9
| align="center"| 40
|
|
| rowspan="4" 
|-
! scope="row"| "Remember Me"
| align="center"| 6
| align="center"| 5
|
 RIAJ: Gold
| 
|-
! scope="row"| "Dark Crow"
| align="center"| 3
| align="center"| 9
|
| 
|-
! scope="row"| "Change the World"
| align="center" rowspan="1"| 2020
| align="center"| 4
| align="center"| 38
|
|
|-
! scope="row"| "Into the Deep"
| align="center" rowspan="2"| 2021
| align="center"| 2
| align="center"| 25
|
| 
| align="center" rowspan="2"| Break and Cross the Walls I|-
! scope="row"| "Merry-Go-Round"
| align="center"| 2
| align="center"| 38
|
|
|-
! scope="row"| "Kizuna no Kiseki"
| align="center" rowspan="1"| 2023
| 
| 
|
| 
| 
|}

DVDs

Covers

Awards and nominations
MTV Video Music Awards Japan

|-
| 2013
| "Distance"
| Best Rock Video
| 
|-
| 2014
| "Database" (featuring Takuma of 10-FEET)
| Best Collaboration
| 
|-
| 2015
| "Out of Control" (featuring Zebrahead)
| Best Collaboration
| 
|}

CD Shop Awards

|-
| 2013
| Mash Up The World (album)
| Grand Prix
| 
|-
| 2015
| Tales of Purefly (album)
| Grand Prix
| 
|}

Space Shower Music Awards

|-
| 2017
| Man with a Mission
| Best Punk / Loud Rock Artist
| 
|}

Tours and concerts
Japan
 Summer Sonic Festival with Various Artists (2011)
 Rock in Japan Festival with Various Artists (2012)
 Summer Sonic Festival with Various Artists (2012)
 Enter Shikari "A Flash Flood of Colour World Tour" with Man With A Mission (2012)
 Punkspring with Various Artists (2013)
 Ozzfest Japan with Various Artists (2013)
 Summer Sonic Festival with Various Artists (2013)
 Punkspring with Various Artists (2014)
 Fuji Rock Festival with Various Artists (2014)
 Knotfest Japan with Various Artists (2014)
 Hoobastank Japan Tour with guest Man With A Mission (2014)
 Incubus Japan Tour with guest Man With A Mission (2015)
 Punkspring with Various Artists (2015)
 Rising Sun Rock Festival with Various Artists (2015)
 Summer Sonic Festival with Various Artists (2015)
 Fuji Rock Festival with Various Artists (2016)
 Knotfest Japan with Various Artists (2016)
 Guns N' Roses "Not in This Lifetime... Tour" with guest Man With A Mission (2017)
 Punkspring Extra Show with Various Artists (2017)
 X Games Chiba (2022) 

Overseas
 Cash Cash Tour in the United States with guests Man With A Mission and Mitchy C (2012)
 Pentaport Rock Festival in South Korea with Various Artists (2013)
 Formoz Festival in Taiwan with Various Artists (2013)
 Twinkle Rock Festival in Taiwan with Various Artists (2013)
 Knotfest in the United States with Various Artists (2014)
 Rise Against Tour in Russia with guest Man With A Mission (2015)
 Download Festival in the United Kingdom with Various Artists (2015)
 MXPX Tour in Germany with guest Man With A Mission (2015)
 Zebrahead European Tour in Germany with guests Man With A Mission and MXPX (2015)
 Zebrahead European Tour in the United Kingdom with guests Man With A Mission and Patent Pending (2015)
 Tuska Heatseeker in Finland with Various Artists (2016)
 Knotfest in the United States with Various Artists (2016)
 Tuska Heatseeker in Finland with Various Artists (2017)
 Dobrofest in Russia with Various Artists (2017)
 Jimmy Eat World Tour in the United States with guest Man With A Mission (2017)
 Stone Sour Fall 2017 U.S. Tour'' in the United States with guests Man With A Mission and Steel Panther (2017)

Stadium anthem
Their song, "Fly Again" is a stadium anthem for the Akita Northern Happinets of the Japanese B.League.

See also
 Japanese rock

References

Further reading

External links

 
 MAN WITH A MISSION's international label page
 
 

2010 establishments in Japan
English-language musical groups from Japan
Japanese alternative metal musical groups
Japanese alternative rock groups
Japanese hardcore punk groups
Masked musicians
Musical groups established in 2010
Musical groups from Shibuya
Rap rock groups